Glen Gano (December 11, 1892 – May 7, 1973) was an American cinematographer and actor.

Early life 
Gano was born in Indiana, United States.

Biography 
Gano was a successful cinematographer through most of the 20th-century. He was credited in works such as Micro-Phonies, Idiots Deluxe and the 1971 film The Incredible 2-Headed Transplant. His last film appearance as an actor was in 1917. He died on May 7, 1973 in Los Angeles, California at the age of 80.

Selected filmography
 The Silent Call (1921)
White Fang (1925)
 Flashing Fangs (1926)
 Romance of the West (1930)
Hot Biskits (1931), Spencer Williams directorial debut
 Gold Fever (1952)

References

External links 

1892 births
1973 deaths
American cinematographers
20th-century American male actors